Mulungu, Ceará is a municipality in the state of Ceará in the Northeast region of Brazil.

Localizada na região cearense do Maciço de Baturité.

References

Municipalities in Ceará